Hilltop is a census-designated place (CDP) in Fayette County, West Virginia, United States. Hilltop has a post office with ZIP code 25855. As of the 2010 census, its population was 624.

References

Census-designated places in Fayette County, West Virginia
Census-designated places in West Virginia